The 2003 Northeast Conference baseball tournament began on May 16 and ended on May 18, 2003, at FirstEnergy Park in Lakewood, New Jersey.  The league's top four teams competed in the double elimination tournament.  Top-seeded  won their second of three consecutive tournament championships and earned the Northeast Conference's automatic bid to the 2003 NCAA Division I baseball tournament.

Seeding and format
The top four finishers were seeded one through four based on conference regular-season winning percentage.

Bracket

Most Valuable Player
Zack Herrick of Central Connecticut was named Tournament Most Valuable Player.  Herrick pitched 8 innings, allowing no runs while striking out three and walking four to win the final game.

References

Tournament
Northeast Conference Baseball Tournament
Northeast Conference baseball tournament
Northeast Conference baseball tournament